The 2002 Lima bombing was a car bomb attack in Lima, Peru that occurred just outside the embassy of the United States, killing nine people and injuring thirty-two. The blast came just three days prior to a visit to Peru from the United States President George W. Bush. No Americans were caught in the explosion. An estimated  of explosives was used in the attack.

Attack
The bomb was planted at a mall four blocks from the American embassy. A seven-floor hotel and a branch of the Banco de Crédito del Perú bank were damaged, but the embassy compound itself, sitting behind a 20 ft high wall and distant from the street, received no apparent damage. Two embassy security guards and one police officer were among the dead.

Peruvian President Alejandro Toledo said he will "not permit democracy to be undermined by terrorist attacks." The interior minister claimed that the attack will not stop Bush's scheduled visit to Lima to meet with Toledo and the leaders of Colombia, Bolivia and Ecuador. A statement from the U.S. embassy said "We condemn the barbaric terrorist bombing this evening in the vicinity of our embassy in Lima." Minutes before leaving for Peru, Bush apparently said "You bet I'm going."

Responsibility
The United States suspected that guerillas from the left-wing Shining Path terror group perpetrated the attack. International terrorists groups including Al-Qaeda and Revolutionary Armed Forces of Colombia (FARC) were also suspected. However the main suspicion lay on Shining Path. The group however never claimed responsibility, nor did the Túpac Amaru Revolutionary Movement (MRTA), another terrorist group in the terrorist war that happened in Peru. An analyst claimed the attack may have been motivated against Bush's War on Terror.

The MRTA previously bombed the United States embassy in Lima on January 15, 1990. It was bombed again on July 27, 1993, this time by Shining Path. Four people were wounded in this attack.

See also
2001 Peru shootdown

References

2002 murders in Peru
Improvised explosive device bombings in 2002
Attacks on diplomatic missions of the United States
Car and truck bombings in South America
Crime in Lima
Internal conflict in Peru
March 2002 events in South America
Mass murder in 2002
Peru–United States relations
Shopping mall bombings
Terrorist incidents in Peru
Terrorist incidents in Peru in the 2000s
Terrorist incidents in South America in 2002